Russ Regan (born Harold Rustigian; October 15, 1928 in Sanger, California – May 27, 2018 in Palm Springs, California) was an American record executive who was President of both UNI Records and 20th Century Records and was vice-president of A&R  at Motown. Regan is the rare executive to have seen No. 1 hits in four successive decades.

Career
He started his career in the 1950s as a composer and record producer. His first notable hit was a 1959 Christmas novelty song, inspired by "The Chipmunk Song", titled "The Happy Reindeer" credited to Dancer, Prancer and Nervous (No. 34, Pop) issued by Capitol Records. In the early 1960s, Regan recorded "Joan of Love", backed with "Adults Only", which was released under the name Russ Regan. He also recorded "Calling All Cars" under the name Davy Summers for Warner Brothers with producer Sonny Bono. In the mid-1960s, he was drafted in to help form a musical direction for Warner Brothers' fledgling pop/soul music subsidiary, Loma Records.

Regan started in record promotion with Motown in the early years of the company. His first project there was the company's first Billboard Hot 100 number one record, "Please Mr. Postman" by The Marvelettes in 1961. He would go on to promote songs by The Supremes, Smokey Robinson & The Miracles, Stevie Wonder, The Temptations, and Marvin Gaye. He suggested the name of The Beach Boys when a Los Angeles group called Carl & The Passions had just recorded a song called "Surfin'". He also helped Frank Sinatra record his No. 4 hit, "That's Life" in 1966. He struck a deal with Jimmy Miller Productions when Miller left The Rolling Stones, which resulted in albums from B.B. King, Henry Gross, Bobby Whitlock, and others. Regan also signed Ambrosia and Harriet Schock to 20th Century Records.

Russ Regan played a major role in the careers of a number of recording artists, as he headed up labels such as Uni, 20th Century and Phonogram Records. Dozens of recording artists, including Elton John, Neil Diamond, Barry White, Olivia Newton-John and The Beach Boys had Regan to thank for opening the doors for their success. One of his most surprising successes while at UNI was South African trumpeter Hugh Masakela's "Grazing In The Grass" in 1968, which sold over a million and reached the top spot in the Billboard pop chart.

While President of 20th Century Records, Regan was inspired from a dream to create the movie All This and World War II, which saw Fox News footage from WWII backed with various artists singing Beatles songs. The movie was never released on video, and it remains in the vaults of 20th Century Fox. Regan also supervised the soundtracks for the movies Endless Love, Breakin', The Karate Kid, All The Right Moves, Love At First Bite, This Is Spinal Tap, and A Chorus Line. Regan was also the Music Supervisor for four Academy Award-winning songs from the films The Poseidon Adventure, The Towering Inferno, Flashdance, and Chariots of Fire.

Notes

References

External links
 

1929 births
2018 deaths
Record producers from California
People from Sanger, California
Businesspeople from California
Songwriters from California
20th-century American businesspeople